Vivian Lai Yi-ling is a Taiwanese-born Singaporean actress & television host.

Life and career
Born in Taiwan, Lai migrated to Singapore with her Taiwanese family when she was still a student. She joined Star Search Singapore 1999 and was the winner in the Singapore edition and the overall champion in the female contestants' category.

Lai started out as an actress, making her debut in Knotty Liaisons, and won good reviews. She eventually diversified into hosting and has hosted various kinds of programmes ranging from food reviews to travelogues. In 2012, after numerous nominations, she won her first professional award, the Best Supporting Actress award, at the Star Awards 2012 for her role as a Chinese immigrant in Love Thy Neighbour.

At the Star Awards 2015, Lai received the All-Time Favourite Artiste after winning the Top 10 Most Popular Female Artistes award from 2001, 2003-2004, 2007-2014 respectively with Jeanette Aw.
 
Lai is also the brand ambassador for Pokka beverages, Kirei Kirei soap, Samsung electrical appliances and Osim massage.

Personal life
Lai is married to Alain Ong and the couple have two daughters, Vera and Ariel. Alain Ong is the CEO of Pokka International and Deputy Group CEO of Pokka Corporation which Lai has been brand ambassador for multiple years from around 2008. This has thus attracted its fair share of controversy, amid allegations of conflict of interest which in 2012, she was paid S$1 million to continue endorsing the brand.

In September 2018, her husband, Ong, was suspended from his posts by Pokka Corporation following an internal audit and would later take up a new appointment offered by Kimly, which he was a non-executive director of Kimly.  Lai's contract as an ambassador was terminated in the following month, despite claims by Mediacorp that her contract would remain unchanged.

Filmography

Film

TV series

Variety shows

Compilation album

Accolades

References

External links
Archived Bio on MediaCorp TV website

Singaporean television actresses
Singaporean film actresses
Singaporean television personalities
Living people
Taiwanese emigrants to Singapore
20th-century Singaporean actresses
21st-century Singaporean actresses
Actresses from Taipei
1976 births